Ampelophaga is a genus of moths in the family Sphingidae.

Species
Ampelophaga dolichoides – (R. Felder, 1874)
Ampelophaga khasiana – Rothschild, 1895
Ampelophaga nikolae – Haxaire & Melichar, 2007
Ampelophaga rubiginosa – Bremer & Grey, 1853
Ampelophaga thomasi – Cadiou & Kitching, 1998

 
Macroglossini
Moth genera
Taxa named by Otto Vasilievich Bremer